Charterhouse Square School is an independent, non-selective, co-educational day school with 250 children aged 3 to 11, situated in the Barbican area of the City of London. It occupies a five-story Victorian building overlooking Charterhouse Square near what used to be a Carthusian monastery. The school was founded by Jamie Malden in 1985 with 23 children.

Charterhouse is a member of Cognita Schools, an association of independent schools in UK and overseas. It is not connected with Charterhouse School, a public boarding school which was founded near the square before moving to its current location in Godalming, Surrey.

Curriculum
The 2012 Ofsted inspection rated Charterhouse's curriculum and teaching as "outstanding". Many former pupils go on to leading independent schools in London including City of London School for Girls, City of London School, Forest School and Highgate School.

Classrooms are colour-coded by age and ability rather than class.
Green Room - 3 years
Red Room - 4 years
Yellow Room - 5 years
Blue Room - 6 years
Rainbow Room - 7 years
Balloon Room - 8 years
Kite Rooms - 9 years
Star Room - 10/11 years

References

External links
School Website
Profile on Cognita Schools website
2009 Ofsted Inspection Report
Profile on the Independent Schools Council website

Cognita
Private co-educational schools in London
Private schools in the City of London
Preparatory schools in London